Udhyogastha is a 1967 Indian Malayalam film, directed by P. Venu and produced by P. K. Devadas and P. S. Das. The film stars Prem Nazir, Sathyan, Madhu and Sharada in the lead roles. The film was scored by M. S. Baburaj.

Plot
Udhyogastha is about an honest and kind lady officer who sacrificed her life for the sake of her family.

Cast

Prem Nazir as Gopi
Sathyan as Rajan
Madhu as Rajasekharan
Sharada as Vimala
Sukumari as Janakiyamma
Rajasree 
Adoor Bhasi as Swami
Shobha
T. S. Muthaiah as Menon
K. P. Ummer as Hari
Kaduvakulam Antony as Sankunni
Lakshmi (Old)
Mala Shantha as Malathy
Nellikode Bhaskaran as Khader
Ravi Vamanapuram
Sreedharan
Vijayanirmala as Sujatha

Soundtrack
The music was composed by M. S. Baburaj and the lyrics were written by Yusufali Kechery.

References

External links
 

1967 films
1960s Malayalam-language films
Films directed by P. Venu
Films scored by M. S. Baburaj